Maweni is an administrative ward in the Manyoni District of the Singida Region of Tanzania. In 2016 the Tanzania National Bureau of Statistics report there were 8,639 people in the ward.

References

Wards of Singida Region